This is a list of the candidates who ran for the Alberta New Democratic Party in the 28th Alberta provincial election. The party ran a full slate of 87, winning 4.

Calgary area (28 seats)

Edmonton area (26 seats)

Remainder of province (33 seats)

See also
Alberta Electoral Boundary Re-distribution, 2010

References

2012
New Democratic Party candidates, 2012 Alberta provincial election Alberta